HD 191829 (HR 7714) is a solitary star located in the southern constellation Telescopium. It has an apparent magnitude of 5.632, making it faintly visible to the naked eye if viewed under ideal conditions.

HD 191829 has a stellar classification of K4 III, indicating that the object is an ageing K-type giant.

References

Telescopium (constellation)
K-type giants
191829
7714
99747
Durchmusterung objects
Telescopii, 81